BattersbyHowat Architects (also known as Battersby Howat) is an architecture, landscape architecture, and interior design firm based in Vancouver, Canada, with a second office in Edmonton. The practice was founded in 1996 by partners David Battersby and Heather Howat.

History 
Battersby and Howat met during their undergraduate degree programs at the University of Manitoba, where they studied landscape architecture and interior design respectively. They completed their graduate studies in architecture at the Technical University of Nova Scotia (TUNS), which has since been merged with Dalhousie University. After university, the pair married and moved to Vancouver to open their architectural practice. While the marriage has since ended, their friendship and professional partnership continue.

Architectural style 
The firm is known for their multidisciplinary approach to projects; wherever possible, they design the landscape in tandem with the architecture. The reciprocal relationship between nature and artifice, especially in contrasted interior and exterior contexts, is a frequent motif in their works. Battersby has said that he appreciates the contrast of "crisp architecture and soft landscape; when everything is rigorous, it tends to be overwhelming." Their vernacular approach to architecture takes full advantage of the mild climate and abundance of nature in British Columbia, evoking notable West Coast influences such as Arthur Erickson, Richard Neutra, and Rudolph Schindler.

Selected projects

Cornwall (2006) 
This multi-family development is located on Cornwall Avenue in Vancouver, opposite Kitsilano Beach. Each of the four suites occupies an entire floor, with northerly views towards the ocean and Stanley Park. While the firm is often lauded for their ability to connect their projects with rugged, wild sites, this project was designed around the relationship between the site and its surrounding urban landscape. Concrete walls running north-south are staggered around the long, narrow site to articulate interior and exterior spaces while maintaining privacy between residents and adjacent developments. The intermediate spaces formed by these walls between the site and its neighbor create an oasis of landscaped courts.

Gambier 1 (2007) 
Accessible only by boat, Gambier 1 is a getaway cabin located on Gambier Island in the Gulf Islands, between Vancouver Island and the mainland. The cabin sits on a dramatic four-story cliff face that overlooks Howe Sound. The project is exemplary of the firm's commitment to sustainable practices and protecting natural landscapes. Special attention was given to the impact of construction — for example, the floor slab is cantilevered from the foundation to minimize excavation and the use of footings. The ground freed up by the cantilevering provides space for bracken fern and other indigenous vegetation to flourish. The exterior is clad in vertically-oriented dark stained cedar siding, recalling the bark of conifers that surround the site.

Whistler Residence (2013) 
The residence, located on a slope in the resort community of Whistler, British Columbia, is a modern take on the timber chalets local to the area. The design captures the "essential" qualities of a ski lodge, such as exposed timber beams, while dispensing with the formal and stylistic constraints associated with this typology. The visual mass of the building is broken up by the illusion that a significant section of it is below grade. This effect was achieved by carefully blasting away at the bedrock to create a sort of basin around the building. Much of the exterior is covered in dark shingles, referencing the local style. This is contrasted by sections of exposed precast concrete panels. Recesses in the facade are lined with either red cedar or large panels of glazing, inviting warmth and light into the interior.

List of projects 

 2018 Edgemont, North Vancouver, British Columbia
 2018 Patricia Heights, Edmonton, Alberta
 2018 West 21st, Vancouver, British Columbia
 2018 McLeod Building 1, Edmonton, Alberta
 2017 Southlands, Vancouver, British Columbia
 2016 West 5th, Vancouver, British Columbia
 2015 Fairmile, West Vancouver, British Columbia
 2014 Valdes Island, Valdes Island, British Columbia 
 2014 Burnkit Design Studio, Vancouver, British Columbia
 2011 Kadenwood 1, Whistler, British Columbia
 2009 Aritzia Headquarters, Vancouver, British Columbia
 2008 Tolmie, Vancouver, British Columbia
 2007 Gambier 1, Gambier Island, British Columbia
 2006 Cornwall, Vancouver, British Columbia
 2004 Gulf Island Residence, Gulf Islands, British Columbia
 2001 Midblock Residence, Vancouver, British Columbia

Awards 

 2019 Lieutenant Governor of British Columbia Award, Award of Merit for Edgemont Residence
 2018 Western Living's Designer of the Year, Designer of the Year: Landscape
 2012 Canadian Architect Award of Excellence for UBC Geological Field School, Oliver, BC
 2011 Western Living's Designer of the Year, Designer of the Year: Architecture
 2011 Western Living's Designer of the Year, Designer of the Year: Interior Design
 2008 Interior Designers Institute of BC (IDIBC) Award of Excellence for Aritzia Headquarters
 2007 Interior Designers Institute of BC (IDIBC), Award of Excellence for 1181 Davie Street
 2006 Canada Council's Ron Thom Award, Early Achievement in Architecture
 2006 Western Living's Best in the West Award, Medium House Category
 2005 Western Living's Best in the West Award, Large House Category
 2004 Canadian Architect Award of Excellence for North Bend Residence
 2001 Canadian Architect Award of Excellence for Mayne Island Residence

References

External links 
 Official website

1996 establishments in British Columbia
Companies based in Vancouver
Architecture firms of Canada
Canadian landscape architects
Interior design firms